Campiglossa variabilis is a species of fruit fly in the family Tephritidae.

Distribution
The species found in British Columbia, Montana, South to California, Colorado.

References

Tephritinae
Insects described in 1899
Diptera of North America